Jian Wang (born 1968 in Xi'an, China) is a Chinese cellist.

Jian Wang began to study the cello with his father when he was four. While a student at the Shanghai Conservatoire, he was featured in the celebrated documentary film From Mao to Mozart: Isaac Stern in China. In 1981, at 12 years old, Jian made his professional debut playing the Saint-Saëns cello concerto with the Shanghai Symphony Orchestra at the Shanghai Music Hall. In 1985, with Mr Stern's encouragement, he entered the Yale School of Music under a special programme where he studied with the renowned cellist Aldo Parisot. 

As a soloist, Jian Wang has performed with many of the worlds leading orchestras, including Berlin Philharmonic, Royal Concertgebouw orchestra, New York and Los Angeles Philharmonic, Cleveland and Philadelphia orchestras, Chicago, Boston and Detroit Symphonies, London Symphony, the Halle, the BBC orchestras, Zurich Tonhalle, Gothenburg Symphony, Stockholm Philharmonic, Santa Cecilia, La Scala, Mahler Chamber, Orchestre National de France, Orchestre de Paris, Czech Philhamonic, and NHK Symphony. These concerts have been with many of the greatest conductors, such as Abbado, Sawallisch, Jarvi, Chailly, Dutoit, Eschenbach, Chung, Gilbert and Gustavo Dudamel. Jian Wang also collaborates frequently with all the major Chinese Orchestras, including Shanghai Symphony, China Philharmonic, China NCPA orchestra, China National orchestra, Guangzhou, Hangzhou, and Shenzhen symphony orchestras. These concerts have been with one of his closest musical partners Long Yu, as well as Muhai Tang, Chen Zuo Huang, Lu Jia, Zhang Guo Yong, Yang Yang, Lin Da Ye, Jing Huan and Zhang Jie Ming. Jian Wang was appointed as the first ever Artist in Residence by the China National Center for Performing Arts, also by the Shanghai Symphony orchestra. As a jury member, Jian Wang has judged many of the most important competitions, including the Tchaikovsky cello competition, the Queen Elizabeth cello competition, the Isaac Stern violin competition and the Nielsen violin competition. Jian Wang now serves as the International Chair of the Cello for the Royal Birmingham Conservatoire. He also serves as a member of Artistic committee for the Shanghai and Hangzhou Symphony orchestras. 

Jian Wang has made many recordings, his latest releases being the Elgar Cello Concerto with the Sydney Symphony and Vladimir Ashkenazy. He has also recorded an album of short pieces for Cello and Guitar titled Reverie, the complete Bach Cello Suites and a Baroque Album with the Camerata Salzburg, Brahms's Double Concerto with the Berlin Philharmonic Orchestra, Claudio Abbado and Gil Shaham, the Haydn Concerti with the Gulbenkian Orchestra under Muhai Tang, Messiaen's Quartet for the End of Time (with Myung-Whun Chung, Gil Shaham and Paul Meyer) and Brahms, Mozart and Schumann chamber music with Pires and Dumay. His instrument is graciously loaned to him by the family of the late Mr. Sau-Wing Lam..

Recordings
"Presenting Jian Wang" (Delos Records, 1992)
 Brahms - "Piano Trios" with pianist Maria João Pires and violinist Augustin Dumay (Deutsche Grammophon, 1995)
 Mozart - "Piano Trios K.496 & K.502" with pianist Maria João Pires and violinist Augustin Dumay (Deutsche Grammophon, 1997)
"Haydn Cello Concertos" Muhai Tang,(Deutsche Grammophon, 1999)
"Olivier Messiaen:  Quartet for the End of Time" with Gil Shaham, Paul Meyer and Myung-Whun Chung  (Deutsche Grammophon, 2001)
"Brahms Double Concerto" with Gil Shaham and Claudio Abbado (Deutsche Grammophon, 2001)
"The Baroque Album" (Deutsche Grammophon, 2003)
"JS Bach:  The Unaccompanied Cello Suites" (Deutsche Grammophon, 2005)
"Reverie" with guitarist Göran Söllscher (Deutsche Grammophon, 2007)

External links
Standard short biography of Jian Wang on the site of Deutsche Grammophon

1968 births
Living people
Chinese classical cellists
People's Republic of China musicians
Yale School of Music alumni
Musicians from Xi'an